is a sub-story of the Puyo Puyo series, developed by Sonic Team and published by Sega for the Nintendo DS, PlayStation 2, PlayStation Portable, and Wii. It has not been released outside of Japan for any consoles. This is the first Puyo Puyo game to be released on the Wii console.

Plot 
Ms. Accord, the teacher at Primp Magic School, informs Sig of an upcoming tournament where the reward is a medal that will grant any single wish. Sig witnesses six comets fall down onto Earth, but decides to ignore them and joins the competition. It turns out that the comets are actually six characters from the Madou Monogatari series, who serve as boss characters in the story modes.

Characters 
As Puyo Puyo! 15th Anniversary was created to commemorate the fifteenth anniversary of Puyo Puyo, it includes most of the Fever characters, plus six characters originating from the Madou Monogatari series. There are a total of twenty-two characters in this game.

Gameplay 
Puyo Puyo! 15th Anniversary has a slew of new modes, and also includes modes that emulate the original Puyo Puyo, Puyo Puyo Tsu and Puyo Pop Fever. In most cases, players are eliminated when they top out, and the last player standing wins the round.

Puyo Puyo
This mode emulates the gameplay of the original Puyo Puyo.
Puyo Puyo 2
This mode emulates the gameplay of Puyo Puyo Tsu.
Puyo Puyo Fever
Similar to the gameplay of Puyo Pop Fever and Puyo Puyo Fever 2, but with some small changes. The Fever counter is an accurate timer and cannot be extended by the end of a chain. In addition, fever time is now earned when the player makes a chain that does not offset, instead of when the opponent offsets. 
Big Puyo
In this mode, Puyo are twice as large as usual, making the board effectively a quarter of its standard size. Fewer Nuisance Puyo are sent to opponents as a result.
Bomber
Instead of sending Nuisance Puyo, players send bomb blocks, which explode after the user with them makes a certain number of moves, changing all surrounding Puyo into Hard Puyo.
Endless Fever
Players start off with a Fever that does not end and a large number of pending Nuisance Puyo. They can't fall, however, and successfully offsetting them will end the game.
Excavation
Each player starts with their board half-filled with Nuisance Puyo. The goal is to pop the Star Puyo hidden in the bottom row, which will send unlimited Nuisance Puyo to opponents. 
Spinner
In Spinner mode, the boards will rotate every 15 seconds, after waiting for players to drop their last Puyo. The Puyos then fall as if affected by gravity. A special bonus is given to chains that start or continue during the spin.
Ice Blocks
Instead of sending Nuisance Puyos, players send frozen Puyo blocks, which become unfrozen after the player who has them makes 3 moves.
Mission
In Mission mode, players are given a task which they must complete before their opponents. The first player to completes 3 tasks wins the round.
Searchlight
In this mode, players' Puyo boards are only partially visible on the screen, except during Fever mode. The visibility range is a swaying cone originating from the top of the screen, resembling a searchlight. 
Underwater
Underwater is a slow-moving mode where players drop Puyos into a body of water with two fewer rows than a standard board. Puyo float towards the top when able, and Nuisance Puyo only fall in groups of one line.

Multiplayer 
The Nintendo DS version of 15th Anniversary supports both local and online multiplayer.

Everybody Puyo Puyo 
In this mode, players without a copy of 15th Anniversary can play along with those that do, using DS Download Play. The Download Play version does not contain voices or battle animations but are otherwise functionally identical.

Puyo Puyo, Puyo Puyo Tsu, and Puyo Puyo Fever modes support up to eight players.

Wi-Fi 
In this mode, players can use Nintendo Wi-Fi Connection to play across the internet. Wi-Fi mode supports only 3 modes (Puyo Puyo, Puyo Puyo 2, and Puyo Puyo Fever). Players can play games of between two and four players, either with their friends using the Friend Code system or against random opponents. When playing random games, three-player mode and the original Puyo Puyo rules are not available. Wi-Fi functionality is now unavailable with the termination of WFC in 2014.

Issues 
Puyo Puyo! 15th Anniversary for the DS had several issues.

Saving 
In the original release of Puyo Puyo! 15th Anniversary, a bug existed where data would not be saved more than 255 times. A new version, nicknamed 1.1, was released to solve the problem on January 20, 2007. Information on how to find out the game version and instructions on how to get replacement can be found on Sega's website.

Wi-Fi 
In the original and 1.1 versions of the DS game, both players lost points when one disconnected from a Wi-Fi match. This issue was fixed in a subsequent re-release of the game.

Fever meter bug 
While playing multiplayer games, the fever meter will occasionally freeze on 7 points. Fever mode can be properly entered after another move. This bug can also be seen in version 2.00 of the PC version of Puyo Pop Fever.

Trivia
A comet symbol was added in 15th Anniversary, representing 1440 pieces of Nuisance Puyo. This symbol has been used in all subsequent Puyo Puyo games.

References

External links
Official website 
IGN page
GameSpot page

2006 video games
Wii games
Nintendo DS games
PlayStation 2 games
PlayStation Portable games
Nintendo Wi-Fi Connection games
Puyo Puyo
Puzzle video games
Sega arcade games
Sega video games
Sonic Team games
Japan-exclusive video games
Multiplayer and single-player video games
Video games developed in Japan